The 1998–99 Slovak Extraliga season was the sixth season of the Slovak Extraliga, the top level of ice hockey in Slovakia. 12 teams participated in the league, and HC VSŽ Košice won the championship.

Standings

First round

Final round

Relegation

Playoffs

Quarterfinals

HC Slovan Harvard Bratislava - HK VTJ Spišská Nová Ves 3:0 (12:0, 3:1, 9:3)
HK 36 Skalica - HC ŠKP Poprad 3:0 (6:2, 4:2, 4:3 OT)
Dukla Trenčín - HKm Zvolen 0:3 (2:3 SO, 3:4 SO, 2:3 SO)
HK 32 VA Liptovský Mikuláš - HC VSŽ Košice 1:3 (5:2, 1:5, 2:3 OT, 2:6)

Semifinals 

HC Slovan Harvard Bratislava - HKm Zvolen 3:0 (6:5 OT, 7:1, 5:2)
HK 36 Skalica - HC VSŽ Košice 0:3 (3:5, 1:7, 3:5)

Final 
HC Slovan Harvard Bratislava - HC VSŽ Košice 1:3 (4:1, 5:6, 2:3, 0:3)

External links
 Slovak Ice Hockey Federation

Slovak Extraliga seasons
Slovak
Slovak